Rockin' All Over the World is the tenth studio album by British band Status Quo. It is their first to be produced by Pip Williams and the first to feature Andy Bown as a regular contributor to the band; he would later join the band officially in 1982. Released in November 1977, it reached #5 in the UK.

"A poxy album," said guitarist and singer Francis Rossi. "There's nothing poxy about Rockin' All Over the World," countered guitarist Rick Parfitt. "It's fucking great. Pip added some class into the production and, from then onwards, we got quite posh – for us." Uncharacteristically, bassist Alan Lancaster agreed with Rossi: "When Pip Williams started producing us was when everything started to go wrong."

The title track, written and originally recorded by John Fogerty, was released as a single in September 1977, peaking at #3 in the UK. Its b-side was "Ring of a Change", from their previous studio album. No other singles were issued from the album, although "Can't Give You More" was rerecorded by the band for 1991's "Rock 'Til You Drop" and issued as a single, reaching #37.

The album was reissued by Mercury in 2005 with a bonus track: a cover of the Beatles' "Getting Better", initially recorded in 1976 for the soundtrack of the film All This and World War II. This track was omitted from a deluxe edition released in late 2015; however, for this reissue, the entire album was remixed and reordered by original engineer John Eden. Several of the new mixes feature longer play-outs and the overall sound was stripped back to the core of two guitars, bass and drums, with occasional keyboard parts. As a further bonus, four demos were included.

Track listing 
The original album release included the tracks:
Side one
 "Hard Time" (Francis Rossi, Rick Parfitt) – 4:45
 "Can't Give You More" (Rossi, Bob Young) – 4:15
 "Let's Ride" (Alan Lancaster) – 3:03
 "Baby Boy" (Rossi, Young) – 3:12
 "You Don't Own Me" (Lancaster, Mick Green) – 3:03
 "Rockers Rollin'" (Parfitt, Jackie Lynton) – 4:19
Side two
 "Rockin' All Over the World" (John Fogerty) – 3:36
 "Who Am I" (Pip Williams, Peter Hutchins) – 4:30
 "Too Far Gone" (Lancaster) – 3:08
 "For You" (Parfitt) – 3:01
 "Dirty Water" (Rossi, Young) – 3:51
 "Hold You Back" (Rossi, Parfitt, Young) – 4:30

2005 reissue bonus track
 "Getting Better" (Lennon/McCartney) – 2:19

2015 deluxe edition disc 2: John Eden Remix
 "Hold You Back" - 5:10
 "Baby Boy" - 3:18
 "Rockers Rollin'" - 4:41
 "Who am I?" - 5:10
 "Rockin' All Over the World" - 3:50
 "Dirty Water" - 4:16
 "Can't Give You More" - 5:26
 "Let's Ride" - 3:04
 "For You" - 3:08
 "Too Far Gone" - 3:09
 "You Don't Own Me" - 3:29
 "Hard Time" - 4:39
 "Dirty Water" (1st Demo 1976) - 4:16
 "Baby Boy" (1st Demo 1976) - 2:49
 "Hard Time" (1st Demo 1976) - 4:47
 "Hold You Back" (Studio Demo 1977) - 3:40

Personnel
Status Quo
 Francis Rossi – guitar, vocals
 Rick Parfitt – guitar, vocals
 Alan Lancaster – bass, vocals
 John Coghlan – drums

Additional personnel
 Andy Bown – keyboards, backing vocals
 Frank Ricotti - percussion

Charts

Weekly charts

Year-end charts

Certifications

References

Status Quo (band) albums
1977 albums
Capitol Records albums
Vertigo Records albums
Albums produced by Pip Williams